José María Morr Azuaje (born 12 April 1981) is a Venezuelan football manager and former player who played as a forward. He is the current manager of Metropolitanos.

Playing career
Born in Acarigua, Morr began his career with Portuguesa FC in 1997. He left the club in 2001 for Llaneros, but returned to his former side in 2002.

Morr subsequently resumed his career in the country's Primera División and Segunda División, representing Unión Lara (two stints), Estudiantes de Mérida, Guaros (two stints), Minervén, Llaneros, Deportivo Lara and Portuguesa. He retired with the latter in 2010, aged just 29.

Managerial career
Shortly after retiring Morr took up coaching, being in charge of Deportivo Lara's youth sides. In August 2015, he was appointed Rafael Dudamel's assistant in the Venezuela under-20 team.

In April 2016, after Dudamel was appointed in charge of the full side, Morr was again named his assistant. He left the role on 30 August 2018, to take over first division side Estudiantes de Caracas.

Morr left Estudiantes on a mutual agreement on 28 November 2018, and was named in charge of Metropolitanos on 19 December.

Honours

Manager
Metropolitanos
Venezuelan Primera División: 2022

References

External links

1981 births
Living people
People from Acarigua
Venezuelan footballers
Association football forwards
Venezuelan Primera División players
Venezuelan Segunda División players
Portuguesa F.C. players
Llaneros de Guanare players
Estudiantes de Mérida players
Minervén S.C. players
Asociación Civil Deportivo Lara players
Venezuela under-20 international footballers
Venezuela youth international footballers
Venezuelan football managers
Venezuelan Primera División managers
Guaros F.C. players
21st-century Venezuelan people
Metropolitanos F.C. managers
Estudiantes de Caracas S.C. managers